Mount Roskill is a suburban area in the city of Auckland, New Zealand. It is named for the volcanic peak Puketāpapa (commonly called "Mount Roskill" in English).

Etymology

The name Mount Roskill was first recorded as Mt Rascal in 1841, on a map created by a Wesleyan missionary, referring to the volcanic peak Puketāpapa. The origin of this name is unclear, however an apocryphal story links the name to a livestock thief from the early colonial era, who allegedly used the peak as a grazing area for stolen sheep and cattle. The peak was variously called Mount Roskill or Mount Kennedy (after landowner Alexander Kennedy). The name Mount Roskill for the peak and the surrounding area likely cemented after 1867, when the local government administering Dominion Road was formed, which took the name Mt Roskill Highway Board. The first uses of Mount Roskill to describe the suburb in newspapers come from the late 1860s.

Geography and geological history

The volcanic peak Puketāpapa erupted an estimated 20,000 years ago. The earlier eruption of Ōwairaka / Mount Albert and Puketāpapa blocked the original flow of the Oakley Creek, causing much of the area between the two peaks to become a peaty swamp.

Mount Roskill is located in the south of the Auckland isthmus, approximately seven kilometres to the south of the Auckland city centre. It is surrounded by the neighbouring suburbs of Three Kings, Sandringham, Wesley, Hillsborough and Mount Albert. The Mount Roskill shops are located at the intersection of Mount Albert and Dominion Roads.

History

Early history and colonial era

The area has been settled by Tāmaki Māori iwi hapū and since at least the 13th century. The Oakley Creek, traditionally known as Te Auaunga, was a crayfish, eels and weka for Tāmaki Māori. Harakeke (New Zealand flax) and raupō, which grew along the banks of the creek, were harvested here to create Māori traditional textiles. By the early 18th century, the area was within the rohe of Waiohua. In this period, Puketāpapa was the site of a fortified pā. After the defeat of Kiwi Tāmaki, the paramount chief of the iwi, the area became part of the rohe of Ngāti Whātua (modern-day Ngāti Whātua Ōrākei). During the early 19th century, the focus of life for Ngāti Whātua was at Onehunga and Māngere, and the Mount Roskill area was used seasonally.

Mount Roskill formed a part of a land sale between Ngāti Whātua and the Crown on 29 June 1841. In 1845, Alexander Kennedy of the Union Bank of Australia, purchased much of the area from the Crown, on-selling this to Joseph May in 1849. The Crown sold further parcels of land to settlers in 1848 and 1849, and the area developed into farmland by the late 19th century. A number of large country estates owned by wealthier families were found in the Mount Roskill farmland, such as Joseph May's estate, which was redeveloped into the Akarana Golf Clubhouse. The area was known to early settlers as a good location for raising ducks and geese, and as a source of water for cattle. While the area close to Three Kings in the north had fertile farmland, the southern area of Mount Roskill along the Hillsborough ridge was not as profitable.

In the early 1910s, Mount Roskill became known for its strawberry farms, primarily those operated by William Johnston and Teddy Edwards. After World War I and the return of servicemen, a number of unprofitable strawberry farms were set up in the area, crashing the strawberry market only a decade later. During the 1920s, Chinese New Zealanders Quong Sing and Wong Key developed market gardens at Mount Roskill.

Suburban development

Beginning in the 1920s, private housing estates began developing at Mount Roskill. One of the first developments was the Victory Estate, which was constructed around Dominion Road the 1920s. This was followed by the Winstone Estate, which developed at the foot of Puketāpapa from 1932.

In 1930, the Auckland tramway network was extended south along Dominion Road, reaching Mount Albert Road and creating a new terminus, around which a shopping centre developed (now known as the Mount Roskill Town Centre). From 1939, the New Zealand Government began creating large-scale public housing developments in Mount Roskill, as the land at the end of tramways was comparatively cheap to develop. By 1947, 1,085 new houses had been built in the area, a figure which had grown to 2,529 by 1953. Around 600 houses were part of the government's development at the Lower Wesley Estate, an area west of Three Kings purchased from the Wesley Trust.

Mount Roskill became a borough in 1947, which meant that Mount Roskill now had a mayor, a local council and were able to invest more into the area. One of the earliest issues faced by the new borough was improving stormwater works for housing around the Oakley Creek, after substantial floods in Wesley in 1948 and 1953. During the 1950s, the suburb became known as the "Bible Belt" of Auckland, due to the area's conservative Presbyterian mayor Keith Hay, and because the area had the highest per capita number of churches in New Zealand.

Over time the image of Mount Roskill as a conservative Christian area waned, after a large influx of migrants and refugees into the area. The 2006 film No. 2, shot in Mount Roskill, was inspired by director Toa Fraser's experiences of growing up in Mount Roskill as a multicultural place.

The area was one of the last in the country to go "wet", in 1999, having formally been a dry area where the selling of alcohol was prohibited.

In the early 2000s, work began on extending the Southwestern Motorway north of Hillsborough. This led to 120 properties in Mount Roskill being purchased, in order to make way for the new motorway.

Demographics

Mount Roskill had a population of 17,319 at the 2018 New Zealand census, an increase of 1,188 people (7.4%) since the 2013 census, and an increase of 1,983 people (12.9%) since the 2006 census. There were 5,187 households, comprising 8,754 males and 8,556 females, giving a sex ratio of 1.02 males per female, with 2,853 people (16.5%) aged under 15 years, 4,788 (27.6%) aged 15 to 29, 7,605 (43.9%) aged 30 to 64, and 2,064 (11.9%) aged 65 or older.

Ethnicities were 29.1% European/Pākehā, 5.5% Māori, 15.5% Pacific peoples, 53.5% Asian, and 4.7% other ethnicities. People may identify with more than one ethnicity.

The percentage of people born overseas was 56.3, compared with 27.1% nationally.

Although some people chose not to answer the census's question about religious affiliation, 31.5% had no religion, 34.1% were Christian, 0.4% had Māori religious beliefs, 15.8% were Hindu, 8.8% were Muslim, 2.4% were Buddhist and 2.6% had other religions.

Of those at least 15 years old, 4,764 (32.9%) people had a bachelor's or higher degree, and 1,842 (12.7%) people had no formal qualifications. 1,977 people (13.7%) earned over $70,000 compared to 17.2% nationally. The employment status of those at least 15 was that 7,014 (48.5%) people were employed full-time, 2,016 (13.9%) were part-time, and 588 (4.1%) were unemployed.

Local government 

The first local government in the area was the Mt Roskill Highway Board, that formed on 7 August 1868 to administer and fund the roads in the area. In 1883, the Highway Board became the Mt Roskill Road Board. In 1927, Mt Roskill attempted to become a borough separate from the County of Eden, however this was unsuccessful. After growth in the area, Mt Roskill achieved borough status in 1947, meaning the area now had a borough council and mayor, and was able to invest more into infrastructure projects.

Keith Hay was the longest serving mayor of Mount Roskill, holding the role from 1953 until 1974, when Dick Fickling was elected. Fickling resigned mid-term in 1987, and was replaced by Hay's son David Hay in 1987. In 1970, Mt Roskill and Onehunga boroughs proposed merging into a single entity, however this merger never eventuated.

In 1989, the borough was amalgamated into Auckland City.  On 1 November 2010, the Auckland Council was formed as a unitary authority governing the entire Auckland Region, and Mount Roskill become a part of the Puketāpapa local board area, administered by the Puketāpapa Local Board.

The Puketāpapa local board area forms a part of the Albert-Eden-Puketāpapa ward, which votes for two members of the Auckland Council. The Albert-Eden-Puketāpapa ward is represented by counsellors Christine Fletcher and Julie Fairey.

Mayors (1947–1989) 
During its existence from 1947 to 1989, the borough of Mount Roskill had five mayors:

Amenities and landmarks
The Fickling Convention Centre is a community centre for Mount Roskill. Built in 1976, housing the community library, Citizens Advice Bureau, Fickling Hall. Named after Dick Fickling, the major. Originally envisioned as a small theme park.
Mt Roskill Library was built and opened to public in August 1977. It was refurbished and the floor area extended in November 2011. Mt Roskill Library has English, Māori, Chinese, Tamil, Arabic and Somali collections.
Mount Roskill Rugby Football Club, Bay Roskill Vikings, and Eden Roskill District Cricket Club are based in the suburb.

Education
These schools are on adjoining sites. Mount Roskill Grammar School opened first in 1953, followed by Mount Roskill Primary in 1955 and Mount Roskill Intermediate in 1956.

May Road School opened in 1925, followed by Dominion Road School in 1929, which operated a satellite site of Three Kings School until 1937. Hay Park School opened in 1963.

The school opened in 1925, by the Sisters of St Joseph of the Sacred Heart and the Sisters of Mercy, and was originally a private school.

All these schools are coeducational. Rolls are as of

People 
Mount Roskill has been home to many successful New Zealanders who attended the local schools. Among them are:
Rugby coach John Hart,
Billionaire Graeme Hart,
Evangelist Bill Subritzky
Rugby union international Doug Howlett,
Actor and South Sydney Rabbitohs owner Russell Crowe,
Reserve Bank Governor Alan Bollard,
Tennis player Brett Steven,
Labour MP Phil Goff,
Balmain Tigers, Eastern Suburbs Roosters, Penrith Panthers and Parramatta Eels and New Zealand rugby league international, 1992 Dally M Medallist, former Kiwi coach and commentator Gary Freeman
Former rugby league international Dane O'Hara
Former rugby league international and New Zealand Māori representative Bill Burgoyne
Former New Zealand Warriors, Melbourne Storm, St George-Illawarra Dragons, Parramatta Eels and Cronulla-Sutherland Sharks rugby league international, New Zealand Māori representative and current NRL referee Henry Perenara
Former Parramatta Eels rugby league player Marcus Perenara
Manly-Warringah Sea Eagles and New Zealand rugby league international Steve Matai
New Zealand Warriors captain, rugby league international and professional boxer Monty Betham
Canterbury-Bankstown Bulldogs and Wests Tigers rugby league international Matt Utai
New Zealand Warriors and Kiwi rugby league international Evarn Tuimavave
Parramatta Eels rugby league player Manu Ma'u
New Zealand Warriors rugby league player Ben Henry
Canberra Raiders rugby league player Bill Tupou
Cronulla-Sutherland Sharks rugby league player Sosaia Feki
New Zealand Warriors rugby league player Sione Lousi
New Zealand Warriors rugby league player Sam Lousi
Newcastle Knights rugby league player Paterika Vaivai
The Hay family (of Keith Hay Homes)
Professional cricket player Azhar Abbas
New York Times Best Selling author Nalini Singh

In 2007, the Mount Roskill Community Board commissioned a 176-page book titled Just Passing Through: A History of Mt Roskill (Jade Reidy) which covered the growth of the district from 1840 up until the present time. It identified the significant input of Mount Roskill residents internationally, such as athletics coach Arthur Lydiard in the chapter "How Sport Put Mt Roskill on the World Map."

References

Bibliography
Nicola Legat:"In God We Trust? The Mount Roskillisation of Auckland" Metro 152 (February 1994): 58–67.
David Craig: "Thin Topsoil: Queer Blokes, Moral Modernity and Real Estate Politics in New Zealand's Biggest Borough" in Ian Carter, David Craig and Steve Matthewman: Almighty Auckland? Palmerston North: Dunmore Press: 2004: 

City of Volcanoes: A geology of Auckland - Searle, Ernest J.; revised by Mayhill, R.D.; Longman Paul, 1981. First published 1964. .
Volcanoes of Auckland: The Essential Guide. Hayward, B.W., Murdoch, G., Maitland, G.; Auckland University Press, 2011.

External links

Photographs of Mount Roskill held in Auckland Libraries' heritage collections.

Suburbs of Auckland
Puketāpapa Local Board Area